Evelaynne Alcequiez (born 3 December 1995) is a Dominican footballer who plays as a midfielder. She has been a member of the Dominican Republic women's national team.

Early life
Alcequiez hails from San Francisco de Macorís.

International career
Alcequiez represented the Dominican Republic at the 2012 CONCACAF Women's U-17 Championship qualifying and the 2012 CONCACAF Women's U-20 Championship qualifying. At senior level, she capped during the 2014 Central American and Caribbean Games.

References 

1995 births
Living people
Women's association football midfielders
Dominican Republic women's footballers
People from San Francisco de Macorís
Dominican Republic women's international footballers
Competitors at the 2014 Central American and Caribbean Games